Indecent Songs is an album released by a Polish-Welsh duo Anita Lipnicka and John Porter. Although released on the Polish market, the album is all in English. All songs were written by Lipnicka and Porter.

The album was released on 20 November 2003. It was promoted by the song Bones of Love.  The album is a collection of ballads about love and life, accompanied by the beautiful sound of Porter's guitar, as well as the sound of violin, piano, mandolin and accordion.

The album was a massive success in Poland. It became platinum, and Lipnicka and Porter received the most important Polish music award for their album - the Fryderyk for The Pop Album Of The Year.

The album was released by POMATON EMI.

Track listing
Bones of Love (3:01)
Beggar's Song (5:12)
Heaven Knows Why (3:32)
Then & Now (3:48)
Rose (2:45)
Everything Flows (4:57)
Learning (How to Fall) (4:40)
Cry (4:32)
Way Back to Love (4:28)
Cruel Magic (3:42)
Nobody Else (5:00)
Knock, Knock (4:46)
Strange Bird (4:27)
Sweet Jesus (3:44)

2003 albums